Hilaire Marin Rouelle (15 February 1718 – 7 April 1779) was an 18th-century French chemist. Commonly cited as the 1773 discoverer of urea, he was not the first to do so. Dutch scientist Herman Boerhaave had discovered this chemical as early as 1727. Rouelle is known as "le cadet" (the younger) to distinguish him from his older brother, Guillaume-François Rouelle, who was also a chemist.

References 

1718 births
1779 deaths
People from Mathieu, Calvados
18th-century French chemists
Members of the Royal Spanish Academy